The marsupial family Peramelidae contains all of the extant bandicoots. They are found throughout Australia and New Guinea, with at least some species living in every available habitat, from rainforest to desert. Four fossil peramelids are described. One known extinct species of bandicoot, the pig-footed bandicoot, was so different from the other species, it was recently moved into its own family.

Characteristics
Peramelids are small marsupials, ranging in size from the mouse bandicoot, which is 15-17.5 cm long, to the giant bandicoot, which at 39–56 cm in length and up 4.7 kg in weight, is about the size of a rabbit. They have short limbs and tails, smallish, mouse-like ears, and a long, pointed snout.

Peramelids are omnivorous, with soil-dwelling invertebrates forming the major part of their diet; they also eat seeds, fruit, and fungi. Their teeth are correspondingly unspecialised, with most species having the dental formula 

Female peramelids have a pouch that opens to the rear and contains eight teats. The maximum litter size is, therefore, eight, since marsupial young are attached to the teat during development, although two to four young per litter is a more typical number. The gestation period of peramelids is the shortest among mammals, at just 12.5 days, the young are weaned  around two months of age, and reach sexual maturity at just three months. This allows a given female to produce more than one litter per breeding season and gives peramelids an unusually high reproductive rate compared with other marsupials.

Classification
The listing for extant species is based on The Third edition of Wilson & Reeder's Mammal Species of the World (2005), except where the Mammal Diversity Database and IUCN agree on a change.
 Family Peramelidae
 Subfamily Peramelinae
 Genus Crash†
 Crash bandicoot† (fossil)
 Genus Isoodon: short-nosed bandicoots
 Golden bandicoot, Isoodon auratus
 Northern brown bandicoot, Isoodon macrourus
 Southern brown bandicoot, Isoodon obesulus
 Genus Perameles: long-nosed or barred bandicoots
 Western barred bandicoot, Perameles bougainville
 Desert bandicoot, Perameles eremiana† (extinct)
 New South Wales barred bandicoot, Perameles fasciata† (extinct)
 Eastern barred bandicoot, Perameles gunnii
 Southwestern barred bandicoot, Perameles myosuros† (extinct)
 Long-nosed bandicoot, Perameles nasuta
 Southern barred bandicoot, Perameles notina† (extinct)
 Ooldea barred bandicoot, Perameles papillon)† (extinct)
Perameles allinghamensis† (fossil)
Perameles bowensis† (fossil)
Perameles sobbei† (fossil)
 Subfamily Peroryctinae
 Genus Peroryctes: New Guinean long-nosed bandicoots
 Giant bandicoot, Peroryctes broadbenti
 Raffray's bandicoot, Peroryctes raffrayana
cf. Peroryctes tedfordi† (fossil)
cf. Peroryctes sp.† (fossil)
 Subfamily Echymiperinae
 Genus Echymipera: New Guinean spiny bandicoots
 Long-nosed spiny bandicoot, Echymipera rufescens
 Clara's spiny bandicoot, Echymipera clara
 Menzies' spiny bandicoot, Echymipera echinista
 Common spiny bandicoot, Echymipera kalubu
 David's spiny bandicoot, Echymipera davidi
 Genus Microperoryctes : New Guinean mouse bandicoots
 Mouse bandicoot, Microperoryctes murina
 Western striped bandicoot, Microperoryctes longicauda
 Arfak pygmy bandicoot, Microperoryctes aplini
 Papuan bandicoot, Microperoryctes papuensis
 Genus Rhynchomeles
 Seram bandicoot, Rhynchomeles prattorum

References

External links

Peramelemorphs
Mammal families
Taxa named by John Edward Gray